Division No. 21, also informally known as Flin Flon-Northwest, is a census division within the Province of Manitoba, Canada. Unlike in some other provinces, census divisions do not reflect the organization of local government in Manitoba. These areas exist solely for the purposes of statistical analysis and presentation; they have no government of their own.

Census maps show that the division also includes the northernmost portion of Lake Winnipeg (that portion north of the 53rd parallel north) as part of its southeasternmost section.

The division had a population of 21,606 in the Canada 2006 Census.

Demographics 

Cities

 Flin Flon

Towns
 Grand Rapids
 Snow Lake
 The Pas

Rural municipalities
 Kelsey

First Nations reserves
 Chemawawin 2
 Grand Rapids 33
 Moose Lake 31A
 Opaskwayak Cree Nation (21A, 21B, 21C, 21E, 21I)
 Sapotaweyak Cree Nation (partially)

Unorganized areas
 Unorganized Division No. 21

References

External links
Flin Flon-Northwest Census Map
Map of Division No. 21, Manitoba at Statcan 

21
Northern Region, Manitoba